Vikram Sampath  is an Indian popular historian who is noted for writing biographies of Gauhar Jaan and Vinayak Damodar Savarkar.

Sampath was born in Karnataka. After academic training in engineering, mathematics, and finance, he worked in banking. In 2008, he published a history of the Wadiyar Dynasty of Mysore—a childhood fascination. In 2012, he published a biography of Gauhar Jaan, which received critical acclaim and won the Yuva Puraskar in English literature from Sahitya Akademi. The next year, Sampath published a biography of S. Balachander, which also garnered positive reviews.

In 2013, Sampath left his job at Hewlett-Packard to begin a PhD in ethnomusicology and history at the University of Queensland, Australia. In 2019 and 2021, he wrote a two-part biography of Savarkar that received praise for its thorough detail, but was criticised for its uncritical treatment of Savarkar. In September 2021, Sampath was selected as a Fellow of the Royal Historical Society. In February 2022, multiple academics accused Sampath of plagiarism, providing examples of near-identical reproduction of other authors' works in his corpus; Sampath denied the allegations and initiated a lawsuit.

Early life and education
Vikram Sampath's father Sampath Srinivasan was a Tamil banker; his mother Nagamani Sampath was a Marathi housewife. He was raised in Bangalore, and completed his schooling at Sri Aurobindo Memorial School and  Bishop Cotton Boys' School. 

Sampath was trained in Carnatic music since the age of five; among his teachers were Jayanthi Kumaresh and Bombay Jayashri.
Sampath graduated from Birla Institute of Technology and Science, Pilani, with a dual degree in electronics engineering and a master's degree in mathematics.

Against the wishes of his professors, who wanted Sampath to pursue a PhD in topology, he shifted to finance and obtained an MBA from S. P. Jain Institute of Management and Research. In October 2017, Sampath received a doctorate in ethnomusicology and history from the School of Music at University of Queensland, Australia.

Career
Sampath worked at GE Capital in Gurgaon for about eight months until December 2005, then switched to Citibank's Global Decision Management Team at Bangalore, where he worked until March 2008. He went on to join Hewlett-Packard, where he stayed until July 2013. 

Sampath is a former senior fellow at Nehru Memorial Museum & Library, and is the founder and director of Bangalore Lit Fest and ZEE Group's ARTH: A Culture Fest. In February 2014, Sampath was appointed for a three-year tenure as the Executive Director of the Bangalore regional center of Indira Gandhi National Centre for the Arts, from which he resigned in August 2015 for personal reasons. The same year, he resigned from Bangalore Lit Fest after invited authors disagreed with his characterization of the Indian writers protest against government silence on violence and declined to take part in the festival.

Works and reception

Wadiyar dynasty 
Vikram Sampath's first book, a history of the Wadiyar dynasty of Mysore, was published in 2008 by Rupa Publications, a topic that had captivated him since reading the "humiliating portrayal" of Wadiyars in The Sword of Tipu Sultan, and a  "television show’s misrepresentation of a particular era of the dynasty" provided the impetus to explore the subject. Sampath was inspired by the works of Arun Shourie and Ramachandra Guha but said his work is not a "historian's point-of-view"; the lack of an academic training coupled with a disinclination to either Marxism or Hindu Nationalism benefitted him. Suryanath U. Kamath proof-read the work.

A review in The Hindu Literary Review noted the work to be unprecedented for the span of time it chronicles; the reviewer, however, said they found Sampath's "keenness on chronicling details rather than harnessing them for a rigorous academic engagement with forces that shape history" disappointing. His methodology—mundane documentation of all sides to a story absent any historical analysis—was criticized as were his "totally inane" observations. Pavitra Jayaraman's review in Mint found the work to be a "page-turner" that attests to the years of work Sampath had put in the project. Another review in the Business Standard found Sampath to have surpassed all other works produced on similar themes in a non-academic context; he made excellent use of the archives to draft a "riveting" narrative.

Gauhar Jaan 
In 2012, Sampath published a biography of Gauhar Jaan, who was India's first classical musician to record on the gramophone. He had chanced upon Jaan in the Royal Archives of Mysore while researching for the previous book.

All reviewers commended Sampath's meticulous archival work despite the scarcity of sources on figures like Jaan. Ethnomusicologist Peter Manuel found Sampath to have had sketched an "informative and evocative portrait" of Jaan and her politico-cultural milieu despite a non-scholarly approach that lacks citations; his work was hailed as a groundbreaking contribution to studies of Hindustani music. Partha Chatterjee, reviewing for Frontline, found his portrayal of Jaan "an unusual and beautiful book". Harbans Singh, reviewing for The Tribune, praised Sampath's non-judgmental scholarship and forceful recreation of the cultural world inhabited by Jaan. The Hindu Literary Review admired Sampath's nuanced chronicling of the dichotomies that arose with regimes of princely modernity. Sadanand Menon, reviewing for Outlook, found the book be filled with a "glut of [pedantic and tiresome] detail"; the work was held to be 
"at times tiresome, at others ingenuous in its amateurish attempts at reconstructing history".

The book has been translated into Hindi and Marathi. It has also been adapted into an eponymous play by Lillette Dubey and Mahesh Dattani. Ashutosh Gowarikar acquired film rights for the book in 2017.

Digital music archive 
While working on the book, Sampath set up a private, non-profit trust in collaboration with Manipal University to digitize vintage gramophone recordings and make them freely accessible to the public, with funding from T. V. Mohandas Pai. In 2015, Sampath donated the collection to the Indira Gandhi National Centre for the Arts. Since 2013, much of the archive has been accessible for free on SoundCloud. As of 2021, the archive includes almost 15,000 records, 7,000 of which had been digitized.

S. Balachander 
Sampath's third book, which was published in 2013, narrates the life of Veena maestro S. Balachander. Balachander was a controversial figure; Sampath received hate mail but he was extensively helped by Balachander's widow and family during his research. Overall, Sampath found Balachander to be a much-misunderstood and maligned genius.

T. M. Krishna found Sampath's work to be "engaging" and provides "a rare insight into one of the most enigmatic figures in Indian performing art". According to Krishna, "the author has tried to create a social and musical context for the reader, sometimes this intrudes into Balachander's story". Krishna also noted errors on the musical history of South India. A review in Frontline commended Sampath for situating a well-researched, detailed and objective biography of an enigmatic figure within the broader interplays of Carnatic music. The book has been translated into Tamil.

V. D. Savarkar 
Sampath's fourth book is a biography of V. D. Savarkar that was published by Penguin Books in two parts in 2019 and 2021. He stated he was motivated by the lack of a comprehensive biography of Savarkar despite his strong presence in the Indian political discourse for decades.

Janaki Bakhle, an associate professor of Indian history at University of California, Berkeley who reviewed the volumes for India Today, noted despite meticulous and thorough research, Sampath's contribution is wholly uncritical, and he accepts every primary source at face value; Bakhle criticised Sampath's interpretation of concurrent historical events as non-objective and lacking in updates from relevant scholarship. Reviewing for Open, popular historian Manu S. Pillai voiced similar concerns; he praised Sampath's meticulous research and his persuasive case of Savarkar as a martyr who had sacrificed his youth for the cause of nation but criticised his methodologies, especially the uncritical acceptance of Savarkar's self-laudatory memoirs, and Sampath was held to be an unobjective biographer. Madhav Khosla, professor of Political Science at Columbia Law School who reviewed the work for Hindustan Times, commended the detailed narrative but found Sampath's treatment of Savarkar's extremist views and his relationship with the British government less "thoughtful" when compared to another contemporary biography by Vaibhav Purandare. P. A. Krishnan, reviewing for Outlook, found the work to be an elaborate but sympathetic biography. Salil Tripathi, reviewing for Mint, found Sampath's choice of language and analyses to "give away" his obvious bias despite the façade of neutrality; particular attention was drawn to the cavalier descriptions of any massacre perpetrated by Muslims as "genocides". 

Swati Parashar, a professor at the University of Gothenburg who reviewed the volumes for The Hindu, called the comprehensive treatment of Savarkar a "must-read", saying Sampath's biography "brings out the contradictions, complexities and complicities that have shaped his legacy"; and remains a "lesson on how to understand and treat ‘differences’, and appreciate the context and nuances of the lives of contested figures like Savarkar in times of ‘cancel culture’ and intellectual intolerance". Reviewing for The Telegraph, TCA Raghavan described the book as "a straightforward, no-fuss narrative without hyperbole and hero worship".

Baul 
In 2022, Sampath, composer Ricky Kej and scholar Rajib Sarma produced a documentary film titled Who is Baul about the mystical Baul tradition of Bengal; it was directed by Sairam Sagiraju.

Honours 
For his book on Gauhar Jaan, Sampath was awarded the first Yuva Puraskar in English literature by Sahitya Akademi, India, and the Excellence in Historical Research Award by Association for Recorded Sound Collections. Sampath was also accorded with a visiting fellowship by Berlin Institute for Advanced Study. In September 2021, he was selected as a Fellow of the Royal Historical Society.

Plagiarism allegations  

In a letter to the president of the Royal Historical Society dated 11 February 2022, Audrey Truschke, Rohit Chopra, and Ananya Chakravarti accused Sampath of plagiarism and requested Sampath's membership be reviewed and his scholarship be thoroughly examined. 

The letter includes as examples sections from a 2017 publication by Sampath, which lacked explicit attribution and were copied with minimal paraphrasing from works of Vinayak Chaturvedi and Janaki Bakhle. They also cited an example from his biography of Savarkar, in which a paragraph was nearly identical to one in an undergraduate student thesis. It was later supplemented with more examples of identical reproduction from the works of Chaturvedi and R.C. Majumdar. According to the letter, plagiarism detection software had found about 50% of the text in the 2017 publication was plagiarised. Chaturvedi expressed his disappointment at Sampath's lack of ethical standards; Bakhle requested Sampath offer a public apology for unequivocal plagiarism and retract the publication.

He stated the 2017 publication is the transcript of a speech in which he had properly included appropriate attribution, and that the sources remain cited in the bibliography section. The biography paragraph is similar due to dependence on a common source. In response, the complaining authors said referencing a publication is not a free pass to reproduce content; Bakhle also noted the implausibility of numerous footnotes in any speech. None of the complainants except Chakravarti submitted to the jurisdiction of the Court. On the first hearing, an interim order was passed restraining Truschke and others from publishing the letter or any other defamatory material; a weel later and again in May, the court ordered Twitter to remove multiple tweets to such effect Truschke had published despite the order.

Notes

References

Further reading 
 
 

Writers from Karnataka
Historians of India
21st-century Indian historians